Alberto Camilo Velázquez (born 16 July 1934) is a Uruguayan former cyclist. He competed at the 1956 Summer Olympics and the 1960 Summer Olympics.

In 2003 he was honored for his work by the Departmental Board of Montevideo. In 2018 he was awarded the "José Nasazzi - Obdulio Varela" prize awarded by the House of Representatives.

References

1934 births
Living people
Uruguayan male cyclists
Olympic cyclists of Uruguay
Cyclists at the 1956 Summer Olympics
Cyclists at the 1960 Summer Olympics
People from Florida Department
Pan American Games medalists in cycling
Pan American Games gold medalists for Uruguay
Pan American Games silver medalists for Uruguay
Pan American Games bronze medalists for Uruguay
Cyclists at the 1955 Pan American Games
Medalists at the 1955 Pan American Games